Transmembrane Protein 81 or TMEM81 is a protein that in humans is encoded by the TMEM81 gene. TMEM81 is a poorly-characterized transmembrane protein which contains an extracellular immunoglobulin domain.

Gene
TMEM81 is also known as HC3107, UNQ2788, KVLA2788, or MGC75217. In humans, TMEM81 is located on chromosomal band 1q32.1 between the genes CNTN2 and RBBP5 on the reverse strand. The TMEM81 gene is 1332 base pairs long and encodes one transcript containing a single exon.

The predicted promoter region (GXP_180875) for TMEM81 is 1158 bp long and extends from 205,084,360 to 205,085,517 on the reverse strand.

Protein

The TMEM81 precursor peptide is 255 amino acids long with a predicted molecular weight of 28.5 kDa and pI = 8.92.

The protein contains a helical transmembrane region, an extracellular immunoglobulin domain, and an N-linked glycosylation site. A disulfide bridge is predicted to form between residues Cys104 and Cys156.

Protein composition

The mature form (signal peptide removed) of TMEM81 has a slightly increased valine and somewhat decreased methionine composition relative to average proteins. TMEM81 also contains three charge runs, each of which are three amino acids long:

Secondary structure
The extracellular region of TMEM81 is predicted to be composed of beta sheets while the intracellular region likely assumes an alpha helix conformation. The transmembrane region of TMEM81 is helical. An alignment of mature TMEM81 peptide sequences in H. sapiens, M. musculus and G. gallus was used to predict the secondary structure of TMEM81 using Ali2D.

In predication results given above, blue indicates beta strands while red indicates alpha helices. Color saturation is proportional to the confidence of the predication.

Tertiary structure

The tertiary structure of TMEM81 has been predicted using izumo sperm-egg fusion protein 1 as a template. The image on the right depicts a model of residues 19 to 152 with 97.3% confidence with 56% coverage obtained using Phyre2. The red-to-blue color gradation indicates the N- to C-terminus directionality of the structure.

Post-translational modifications
Experimental evidence has been found for an N-glycosylation site located at Asn45 indicating that TMEM81 is a glycoprotein. Several tyrosine residues within TMEM81 have been predicted to undergo sulfation.

Subcellular location
TMEM81 is predicted to be localized to the plasma membrane. However, immunohistochemistry experiments using TMEM81-specific antibodies found localization to intermediate filaments and microfilaments.

Expression

Expression in humans
RNA-seq experiments from the GTEx project found that TMEM81 is ubiquitously expressed in humans but shows enhanced expression in the cerebellum and cerebellar hemisphere. Other tissues and organs showing somewhat enhanced mRNA expression include the testis and spleen.

Expression in rodents
In mice (M. musculus) and rats (R. norvegicus), TMEM81 shows enhanced expression in the testes and relatively low expression in other tissues. Additionally, TMEM81 expression is not localized to the cerebellum in mice.

TMEM81 shows monoallelic expression in both H. sapiens and M. musculus.

Protein expression
In both H. sapiens and M. musculus, TMEM81 is present at a concentration of just under 1 ppm. Relative to other proteins, TMEM81 is present at slightly below the median protein concentration level.

Clinical Significance
Methylation changes in TMEM81 are associated with an increased risk of intermittent explosive disorder. Additionally, SNPs located in TMEM81 affect thrombopoiesis, mean platelet volume, and have been implicated in Meniere’s disease.

Cancer
The 1q32.1 region showed copy number gain with a frequency of 68.9% in a study of 46 breast cancers and was gained in a case of extraventricular central neurocytoma. TMEM81 also has been implicated in the development of hepatocellular carcinoma.

Homology
No paralogs of the TMEM81 gene exist in humans. Orthologs of the gene have been found in various lineages of gnathostomes with the most distantly orthologs found among chondrichthyes. TMEM81 orthologs have not been detected among agnatha, lancelets, tunicates, or invertebrates.

References